William Borland is the name of:

 William Patterson Borland (1867–1919), U.S. Representative from Missouri
 William Borland (loyalist) (1969–2016), Northern Irish former footballer and loyalist activist
 William Borland (darts player) (born 1996), Scottish darts player